This is a list of the best-selling singles in 2000 in Japan, as reported by Oricon.

References

2000 in Japanese music
2000
Oricon
Japanese music-related lists